Gymnaconitum is a genus of flowering plants belonging to the family Ranunculaceae.

Its native range is China.

Species:
 Gymnaconitum gymnandrum (Maxim.) Wei Wang & Z.D.Chen

References

Ranunculaceae
Ranunculaceae genera